The Scottish Coca-Cola Tournament was a golf tournament that was played from 1967 to 1983. It was a 72-hole stroke-play event, played in Scotland. David Huish won the event three times while Norman Wood, John Panton and Harry Bannerman each won in twice. Finlay Morris, the inaugural winner, died, aged 22, in a car accident three months after the event. From 1968 the Finlay Morris Memorial Trophy was awarded to leading player under the age of 25.

Winners

The 1969 event was reduced to 54 holes by bad weather.

References

Golf tournaments in Scotland
Recurring sporting events established in 1967
Recurring sporting events disestablished in 1983
1967 establishments in Scotland
1983 disestablishments in Scotland